Necrobia is a genus of beetles belonging to the family Cleridae.

The genus has cosmopolitan distribution.

Species:
 Necrobia divinatoria Wickham, 1914 
 Necrobia ruficollis (Fabricius, 1775) 
 Necrobia rufipes (De Geer, 1775) 
 Necrobia violacea (Linnaeus, 1758)

References

Cleridae
Cleridae genera
Taxa named by Pierre André Latreille